Struthio anderssoni, also known as the East Asian ostrich, is an extinct species of ostrich that lived in the Pleistocene and Holocene in China and Mongolia.

Description 
Struthio anderssoni was a large ostrich with an estimated mass of 270kg, laying eggs of up to 2400 cm3 in volume.

References

Ostriches
Extinct flightless birds
Late Quaternary prehistoric birds
Neogene birds of Asia
Pleistocene birds
Holocene extinctions
Extinct birds of Asia
Quaternary birds of Asia
Fossil taxa described in 1931